María Silva is a Spanish film and television actress.

Partial filmography

 Una gran señora (1959) - Modelo
 The Last Days of Pompeii (1959) - Julia's Maid
 La fiel infantería (1960)
 Don José, Pepe y Pepito (1961)
 Margarita se llama mi amor (1961) - Alumna que se sienta junto a Nacho
 Siempre es domingo (1961) - Amiga de Carlota
 Pecado de Amor (1961) - Novia y esposa de Ángel Vega
 The Awful Dr. Orlof (1962) - Dany
 Zorro the Avenger (1962) - Irene
 Terrible Sheriff (1962) - Clementine
 Shades of Zorro (1962) - Irene
 Usted tiene ojos de mujer fatal (1962)
 Cristo negro (1963) - Mary Janson
 Tela de araña (1963) - Chica del club
 The Betrothed (1964) - Lucia Mondella
 La muerte silba un blues (1964) - Rosita
 El rapto de T.T. (1964)
 Cavalry Charge (1964) - Valerie Jackson
 Los cuatreros (1965) - Mary Thompson
 Vereda de Salvação (1965)
 002 Operazione Luna (1965) - Dr. Frausink
 I due parà (1965) - Santa
 The Wild Ones of San Gil Bridge (1966)
 Los celos y el duende (1967) - Lucía
 Kill the Wickeds (1967) - Shelley
 Los subdesarrollados (1968) - Laly
 Ballad of a Bounty Hunter (1968) - Isabel Alvarez
 La dinamita está servida (1968) - Olga
 O.K. Yevtushenko (1968) - Pandora Loz
 El huésped del sevillano (1970) - Raquel
 Un par de asesinos (1970) - María Anderson
 When Heroes Die (1970) - Nicole
 Presagio (1970) - Berta Reinaldi
 Tombs of the Blind Dead (1972) - Maria
 Al diablo, con amor (1973)
 El Retorno de Walpurgis (1973) - Elizabeth Bathory
 Me has hecho perder el juicio (1973)
 Un par de zapatos del '32 (1974) - School Teacher
 Odio mi cuerpo (1974) - Mary Knoll 
 Santo and the Vengeance of the Mummy (1975) - Abigail
 Devil's Kiss (1976) - Susan
 Nunca es tarde (1977) - Coro
 Esperando a papá (1980) - Laura
 El lobo negro (1981)
 127 millones libres de impuestos (1981) - Claudia
 Duelo a muerte (1981) - Marquesa
 El lío de papá (1985) - Nuria
 La monja alférez (1987)
 Caminos de tiza (1988)
 Hacienda somos casi todos (1988)

References

Bibliography 
 Peter Cowie & Derek Elley. World Filmography: 1967. Fairleigh Dickinson University Press, 1977.

External links 
 

1941 births
Living people
Spanish film actresses